"30,000 Pounds Of Bananas," sometimes spelled "Thirty Thousand Pounds Of Bananas," is a folk rock song by Harry Chapin from his 1974 album, Verities & Balderdash. The song became more popular in its live extended recording from Chapin's 1976 concert album, Greatest Stories Live that started the phrase "Harry, it sucks." The song is based on an actual truck accident that occurred in Scranton, Pennsylvania, in 1965.

Incident
On March 18, 1965, a 33-year-old truck driver, Eugene P. Sesky, was on his way to deliver a load of bananas to Scranton, Pennsylvania. Sesky, an employee of Fred Carpentier—operator of a small truck line in Scranton—was returning from the boat piers at Newark, New Jersey, where he had picked up his load. The load was destined for the A&P produce Warehouse in South Side. Sesky was driving a 1950s Brockway diesel truck tractor with a  semi-trailer and was headed down Rt. 307 when he lost control. Sesky was unable to control the truck's speed down the hill due to a mechanical failure, variously attributed to the truck's brake system or its clutch. Witnesses reported that Sesky did everything possible to avoid pedestrians and other motorists, including climbing out onto the truck's running board to try to warn people, and some have suggested that he may have deliberately flipped the truck over to avoid striking either bystanders or an automotive service station on Moosic Street that could have exploded in flames, causing a greater loss of life. Sesky was thrown from the truck and killed and bananas were spilled and strewn when the rig came to rest; 15 others were injured but only Sesky died. The road was closed for cleanup as Johnson's Towing Company helped out in the recovery. Trucks under 21,000 lbs were required to go down the hill in first, low gear. Trucks over 21,000 lb (10.5 t) are no longer allowed to travel that route (they must use Interstate 380 via Dunmore).

Song
The song portrays a fictional account of the incident played in the form of a country song. With each verse, the song gets faster to, as Chapin explained in the live recording, "build up intensity and excitement." During the chorus, Chapin sings the phrase "thirty-thousand pounds" followed by Big John Wallace singing the bass line "of bananas." During concerts, the audience was encouraged to shout this refrain.

Content
While approaching Scranton, he passes a sign he "should have seen" reading: "Shift to low gear or fifty-dollar fine, my friend," because he is too busy thinking about seeing his wife after his trip. He begins to travel down the "two-mile drop" road to the bottom of the hill. Suddenly, the truck begins to go faster down the hill, and the driver tries to apply the brakes, only to discover that they are not working. He says, "Christ!" who ironically is "the only Man who could save him now" as the load of bananas push against the truck causing it to pick up speed. Cruising into Scranton at "about ninety miles an hour," he almost strikes a passing bus. The driver then prays twice to God to make the event all a dream before he "sideswiped nineteen neat-parked cars / Clipped off thirteen telephone poles / Hit two houses, bruised eight trees / And Blue-Crossed seven people."

The song's epilogue tells the story how Chapin first heard of the event aboard a Greyhound bus coming out of Scranton some months later. An old man sitting next to Chapin implores him to imagine "30,000 pounds of mashed bananas."

Many details in the song correspond closely to the actual incident, but others are invented or fictionalized.  In particular, Sesky was not actually decapitated in the accident.

Alternate endings
In the live performance from the album Greatest Stories Live, Chapin sings two alternate endings to the song he originally had in mind, explaining to the audience that the rest of the band was less than enthusiastic about them, with his brothers Tom and Steve each offering the summary dismissal, "Harry, it sucks!" The first alternate ending uses the 1923 novelty song "Yes! We Have No Bananas" as the punchline of the song.

The second ending is described by Chapin as a "country-western" ending about "motherhood", because the song "already had a truck." It deals with a young mother crying while watching her child sleeping. The woman is presumably the truck driver's widow and, because of her sorrow over the accident, "though she lives in Scranton, Pennsylvania / she never, ever eats bananas." During concerts, Chapin divided the audience during this ending, usually turning it into a contest between men and women with regard to singing skill. The second alternate ending has everyone sing "of Bananas!" in harmony, swelling to a climax and cutting off.

A third alternate ending surfaced later, in which Chapin would often introduce with a monologue about Donny and Marie Osmond, and the technical definition of the word "sucks". The third alternate ending is a parody of a Chiquita banana commercial, done in "Jimmy Buffett style," with the participation of the whole band. The ending is cut short by Big John singing the first verse of "Taxi" in the form of an upbeat disco style that concludes with Chapin telling him "it sucks."

The Bottom Line CD features the four endings along with "Final Concert." Other recorded examples of the song with all four endings include performances at Knoxville Memorial Stadium on March 7, 1979; the Coffee Break Concert broadcast on WMMS Cleveland on December 5, 1979; and the Boston University concert on April 1, 1981.

"Harry, it sucks" became a popular catchphrase among Chapin's fans, to the point where T-shirts sporting the phrase would be offered at his concerts.

References

1974 songs
Bananas in popular culture
Songs about truck driving
Harry Chapin songs
Scranton, Pennsylvania
Songs based on American history
Songs written by Harry Chapin
Vehicle wreck ballads
Song recordings produced by Paul Leka